This is a list of defunct airlines of the Republic of the Congo.

See also
 List of airlines of the Republic of the Congo
 List of airports in the Republic of the Congo

References

Congo Republic
Airlines
Airlines